Export was an unincorporated community and coal town in Fayette County, West Virginia, United States. It was also known as Robins.

Export was so named on account of the community's chief export, coal.

References 

Unincorporated communities in West Virginia
Unincorporated communities in Fayette County, West Virginia
Coal towns in West Virginia